Kyzylarai is a massif located in Aktogay District, Karaganda Region, Kazakhstan. 

The place is rich in natural and historical sights. Begazy burial grounds (Begazy-Dandybai culture of the Bronze Age) are one of them. The world's largest mountain sheep, the Argali, can be seen in the area.

Geography
Kyzylarai is located in the southern part of the Kazakh Uplands, north of Lake Balkhash and south of the Karkaraly Range. The slightly lower Kyzyltas massif rises to the northwest. 

The highest point of the Kazakh Uplands and of Central Kazakhstan, Mt Aksoran, is located in the massif.

See also
Geography of Kazakhstan

References

Kazakh Uplands
Karaganda Region

kk:Қызыларай
ru:Кызыларай